Red Oaks Mill is a hamlet and census-designated place (CDP) in Dutchess County, in the U.S. state of New York. It lies within the limits of the towns of Poughkeepsie and LaGrange. The population was 3,613 at the 2010 census.

Red Oaks Mill is southeast of the city of Poughkeepsie and can be considered a suburb of the city. It is part of the Poughkeepsie–Newburgh–Middletown, New York Metropolitan Statistical Area as well as the larger New York–Newark–Bridgeport, New York-New Jersey-Connecticut-Pennsylvania Combined Statistical Area.

Geography

Wappinger Creek, a tributary of the Hudson River, flows through the center of the community, forming the border between the towns of Poughkeepsie and LaGrange.

At the center of Red Oaks Mill is a complex intersection where Vassar Road (Dutchess County Route 77), New Hackensack Road (New York State Route 376), Spackenkill Road (New York State Route 113), and a small residential side road all meet. Several shopping plazas, strip malls, and other commercial properties are found at or near this intersection.

Demographics

As of the census of 2000, there were 4,930 people, 1,724 households, and 1,411 families residing in the hamlet. The population density was 1,401.5 per square mile (540.8/km2). There were 1,767 housing units at an average density of 502.3/sq mi (193.8/km2). The racial makeup of the hamlet was 89.74% White, 4.67% African American, 0.14% Native American, 2.80% Asian, 1.50% from other races, and 1.16% from two or more races. Hispanic or Latino of any race were 5.05% of the population.

There were 1,724 households, out of which 36.9% had children under the age of 18 living with them, 71.1% were married couples living together, 7.5% had a female householder with no husband present, and 18.1% were non-families. Fifteen-point-four percent of all households were made up of individuals, and 6.8% had someone living alone who was 65 years of age or older. The average household size was 2.85 and the average family size was 3.17.

In the CDP, the population was spread out, with 26.8% under the age of 18, 5.9% from 18 to 24, 27.9% from 25 to 44, 25.5% from 45 to 64, and 13.9% who were 65 years of age or older. The median age was 39 years. For every 100 females, there were 95.4 males. For every 100 females age 18 and over, there were 93.5 males.

The median income for a household in the CDP was $77,533, and the median income for a family was $80,628. Males had a median income of $59,083 versus $27,697 for females. The per capita income for the CDP was $28,713. About 1.3% of families and 2.8% of the population were below the poverty line, including 5.5% of those under age 18 and 0.9% of those age 65 or over.

References

Poughkeepsie, New York
Hamlets in New York (state)
Census-designated places in New York (state)
Poughkeepsie–Newburgh–Middletown metropolitan area
Census-designated places in Dutchess County, New York
Hamlets in Dutchess County, New York